Capussa was a king of the ancient Numidian tribe Massylii in 206 BCE. He was the son of Oezalces who had succeeded his brother, Gala, on the massylian throne.

Biography 
Oezalces had normally inherited the power since he was the oldest prince. When he died, a few months after his arrival, his eldest son, Capussa, was proclaimed king without Masinissa, son of Gala, attempting to assert his rights since in the order of succession, he was just after his cousin Capussa.

The reign of Capussa was short-lived. A hostile party was formed by Mazaetullus, a Numidian chief related to the royal lineage but having no rights to the throne. Mazaetullus had married the widow of Oezalces, a Carthaginian, which earned him the support of at least a part of the Punic aristocracy concerned perhaps from this time to remove Masinissa from power, although he has until then faithfully served the interests of Carthage fighting under Hasdrubal's orders in Spain.

Capussa was defeated and killed in a coup d'état by Mazaetullus. He proclaimed as a King, Lacumazes, the youngest son of Oezalces, then set himself as a regent.

References

External links 
 Livy, The History of Rome, Book 29, chapter 29

206 deaths
3rd-century BC Berber people
3rd-century BC rulers in Africa